Freeman Chapel C.M.E. Church is a historic Christian Methodist Episcopal church at 137 S. Virginia Street in Hopkinsville, Kentucky which was built during 1923–25.  It was added to the National Register of Historic Places in 1983.

It was deemed significant both for its history and its architecture.  It is a two-story brick Classical Revival-style building on a tall basement foundation.  It has arched clerestory windows.

References

See also
National Register of Historic Places listings in Kentucky

Christian Methodist Episcopal churches in Kentucky
Churches on the National Register of Historic Places in Kentucky
Neoclassical architecture in Kentucky
Churches completed in 1925
Churches in Christian County, Kentucky
African-American history of Kentucky
National Register of Historic Places in Christian County, Kentucky
Neoclassical church buildings in the United States
Hopkinsville, Kentucky
1925 establishments in Kentucky